Hepatozoon cevapii is a species of alveolates protists known to infect snake species such as Crotalus durissus terrificus (rattlesnake).

References

Conoidasida
Parasites of reptiles